Teruel Power Plant was a lignite fired power plant near the town of Andorra in the province of Teruel, community of Aragon, Spain. Lignite room is developed, and contained up to 7% sulphurs. Teruel Power Plant has three generating units with a capacity of 350 megawatts each. In 1992, Teruel Power Plant was equipped with filters, so now more than 90% of the detrimental sulfur dioxide are filtered out from smoke. The plant was closed in 2020.

See also

List of towers
List of chimneys
List of tallest freestanding structures in the world

References

External links
http://www.skyscraperpage.com/diagrams/?b5021

Energy infrastructure completed in 1981
Towers completed in 1981
Coal-fired power stations in Spain
Chimneys in Spain
Buildings and structures in the Province of Teruel
Former power stations in Spain